"They Took the Stars Out of Heaven" is a 1944 song by Floyd Tillman.  The song was the most successful release for Tillman,  on the charts peaking at number one on the Juke Box Folk Records for one week.

References
 

1944 songs
1944 singles
Song articles with missing songwriters
Floyd Tillman songs